Izabela Walentyna Jaruga-Nowacka  (23 August 1950 – 10 April 2010) was a Polish political figure who had served in the national Parliament (Sejm) since 1993 (with a four-year hiatus in 1997–2001) and, in May 2004, rose to become Deputy Prime Minister under Prime Minister Marek Belka, serving until October 2005, while also, concurrently, filling in his cabinet, from November 2004 to October 2005, the position of Minister Polityki Społecznej [Minister for Social Policy].

A native of the Baltic seaport city of Gdańsk, the capital of the Pomeranian Voivodeship, Izabela Jaruga-Nowacka earned a degree in ethnography from the University of Warsaw and, during the 1970s and 80s was employed at the Institute for Science Policy and Higher Education (1974–76) and the Institute of Socialist Nations at the Polish Academy of Sciences (1976–86).  Although not politically active during the Communist period, near its end, in the mid-1980s, she joined the League of Polish Women then, in 1991, became active in Ruch Demokratyczno-Społeczny [Democratic-Popular Movement] and, in the election of 1993, was elected to the Sejm as a member of the Labor Union party.

A dedicated feminist, she remained a member of Sejm 1993–97, Sejm 2001–05, Sejm 2005–07 and was elected for the fourth time in October 2007, running on the platform of the new Left and Democrats party.

Izabela Jaruga-Nowacka and her husband, mathematician Jerzy Nowacki, rector of the Warsaw-based Polish-Japanese Institute of Information Technology, have two daughters, Barbara and Katarzyna.

She was listed on the flight manifest of the Tupolev Tu-154 of the 36th Special Aviation Regiment carrying the President of Poland Lech Kaczyński which crashed near Smolensk-North airport near Pechersk near Smolensk, Russia, on 10 April 2010, killing all aboard.

On 16 April 2010, Jaruga-Nowacka was posthumously awarded the Commander's Cross with Star of the Polonia Restituta.

References

External links

 Izabela Jaruga-Nowacka's website
 Izabela Jaruga-Nowacka at the Sejm website (includes declarations of interest, voting record and transcripts of speeches)

1950 births
2010 deaths
Politicians from Gdańsk
University of Warsaw alumni
Deputy Prime Ministers of Poland
Members of the Polish Sejm 1993–1997
Members of the Polish Sejm 2001–2005
Members of the Polish Sejm 2005–2007
Burials at Powązki Cemetery
Commanders with Star of the Order of Polonia Restituta
Victims of the Smolensk air disaster
Polish feminists
Labour Union (Poland) politicians
Women members of the Sejm of the Republic of Poland
Women government ministers of Poland
20th-century Polish women politicians
21st-century Polish women politicians
Members of the Polish Sejm 2007–2011